The 2012 Tandridge District Council election took place on 3 May 2012 to elect members of Tandridge District Council in Surrey, England. One third of the council was up for election and the Conservative Party stayed in overall control of the council.

After the election, the composition of the council was:
Conservative 34
Liberal Democrats 6
Independent 2

Background
14 seats were contested in 2012, with a total of 49 candidates standing for election. Before the election the Conservatives ran the council with 34 of the 42 seats, while the Liberal Democrats had 6 seats. Other parties standing at the election were the UK Independence Party with 13 candidates, the Labour Party with 6 candidates and 3 candidates from the Green Party.

Among the councillors who stood down at the election was the longest serving councillor Richard Butcher of Woldingham ward, after 39 years on the council.

Election result
The Conservatives and Liberal Democrats finished with the same number seats, after each party gained a seat from the other. This left the Conservatives with 34 seats, the Liberal Democrats on 6 seats and there remained 2 Independent councillors. The Conservatives won 11 of the 14 seats contested, after gaining Whyteleafe from the Liberal Democrats by 81 votes, while the council leader Gordon Keymer was among those to hold their seats.

However the Liberal Democrats won 3 seats and gained a seat from the Conservatives by 99 votes in Warlingham East, Chelsham and Farleigh, where Jeremy Pursehouse regaining a seat on the council he had lost at the 2008 election. Meanwhile, the UK Independence Party failed to win any seats, but did come second in three wards. Overall turnout at the election was 34.53%.

Ward results

By-elections between 2012 and 2014
A by-election was held in Burstow, Horne and Outwood on 2 May 2013 after the resignation of Conservative councillor Michael Keenan over the introduction of same-sex marriage. The seat was held for the Conservatives by Christopher Byrne with a majority of 151 votes over the UK Independence Party candidate Graham Bailey.

References

2012 English local elections
Tandridge District Council elections
2010s in Surrey